The Enterprise City School District is a public school district based in the city of Enterprise, Alabama (USA).

It is also one of three municipal school systems that take Fort Rucker families at the secondary level.

Schools

High school
Grades 9-12
Enterprise High School https://www.enterpriseschools.net/ehs

Junior high schools
Grades 7 and 8
Dauphin Junior High School https://www.enterpriseschools.net/Domain/16
Coppinville Junior High School https://www.enterpriseschools.net/Domain/15

Elementary schools
Grades 1-6
Harrand Creek Elementary School https://www.enterpriseschools.net/Domain/10
Hillcrest Elementary School https://www.enterpriseschools.net/Domain/11
Holly Hill Elementary School https://www.enterpriseschools.net/Domain/12
Pinedale Elementary School https://www.enterpriseschools.net/Domain/13
Rucker Blvd. Elementary School https://www.enterpriseschools.net/Domain/14

Other Campuses
Pre-K and Kindergarten
Enterprise Early Education Center https://www.enterpriseschools.net/Domain/9
Performance Intervention Program
Temporary Alternative Placement https://www.enterpriseschools.net/Domain/17
Career and Technology Education
Enterprise Career and Technology Center https://www.enterpriseschools.net/domain/346

References

External links
Enterprise City Schools - Official site.

School districts in Alabama
Education in Coffee County, Alabama